Rogozinski may refer to:

 Rogozinski (surname)
 Rogoziński Most, a settlement of Gmina Czarna Białostocka, within Białystok County, Poland

See also